Yongding Subdistrict is a subdistrict of Yongding District in Zhangjiajie Prefecture-level City, Hunan, China. The subdistrict was formed through dividing part of the former Yongding Town in 1985.

References

Yongding District
Subdistricts of Hunan